The 2012 Wimbledon Championships are described below in detail, in the form of day-by-day summaries.

Day-by-day summaries

Day 1 (25 June)
 Seeds out:
 Gentlemen's singles:  Tomáš Berdych [6],  John Isner [11],  Andreas Seppi [23],  Marcel Granollers [24]
 Ladies' singles:  Flavia Pennetta [16],  Jelena Janković [18],  Daniela Hantuchová [27],  Monica Niculescu [29]
 Ladies' doubles:  Anabel Medina Garrigues /  Arantxa Parra Santonja [12]
Schedule of Play

Day 2 (26 June)
 Seeds out:
 Gentlemen's singles:  Feliciano López [14],  Bernard Tomic [20],  Kevin Anderson [32]
 Ladies' singles:  Lucie Šafářová [19],  Svetlana Kuznetsova [32]
Schedule of Play

Day 3 (27 June)
 Seeds out:
 Gentlemen's singles:  Stan Wawrinka [25]
 Ladies' singles:  Samantha Stosur [5],  Caroline Wozniacki [7],  Li Na [11],  Dominika Cibulková [13],  Petra Cetkovská [23]
 Gentlemen's doubles:  Mariusz Fyrstenberg /  Marcin Matkowski [3],  Colin Fleming /  Ross Hutchins [13]
Schedule of Play

Day 4 (28 June)
 Seeds out:
 Gentlemen's singles:  Rafael Nadal [2],  Gilles Simon [13],  Alexandr Dolgopolov [22]
 Ladies' singles:  Marion Bartoli [9],  Anastasia Pavlyuchenkova [31]
 Gentlemen's doubles:  Alexander Peya /  Nenad Zimonjić [6],  Marcel Granollers /  Marc López [9],  František Čermák /  Filip Polášek [11]
 Ladies' doubles:  Gisela Dulko /  Paola Suárez [14],  Chuang Chia-jung /  Vera Dushevina [16]
Schedule of Play

Day 5 (29 June)
 Seeds out:
 Gentlemen's singles:  Janko Tipsarević [8],  Nicolás Almagro [12],  Juan Mónaco [15],  Fernando Verdasco [17],  Milos Raonic [21],  Radek Štěpánek [28],  Julien Benneteau [29]
 Ladies' singles:  Vera Zvonareva [12],  Nadia Petrova [20],  Anabel Medina Garrigues [26],  Christina McHale [28]
 Gentlemen's doubles:  Max Mirnyi /  Daniel Nestor [1],  Santiago González /  Christopher Kas [12],  Eric Butorac /  Jamie Murray [14]
 Ladies' doubles:  Květa Peschke /  Katarina Srebotnik [3],  Iveta Benešová /  Barbora Záhlavová-Strýcová [8]
Schedule of Play

Day 6 (30 June)
 Seeds out:
 Gentlemen's singles:  Kei Nishikori [19],  Andy Roddick [30]
 Ladies' singles:  Sara Errani [10],  Julia Görges [22],  Zheng Jie [25]
 Gentlemen's doubles:  André Sá /  Bruno Soares [16]
 Ladies' doubles:  Irina-Camelia Begu /  Monica Niculescu [15]
 Mixed Doubles:  Mahesh Bhupathi /  Sania Mirza [5],  Jürgen Melzer /  Iveta Benešová [12],  Fabio Fognini /   Sara Errani [13],  David Marrero /  Nuria Llagostera Vives [14]
Schedule of Play

Middle Sunday (1 July)
Following tradition, Middle Sunday is a day of rest, with no matches scheduled. Play resumes on the next day.

Day 7 (2 July)
 Seeds out:
 Ladies’ Singles:  Maria Sharapova [1],  Ana Ivanovic [14],  Roberta Vinci [21],  Francesca Schiavone [24],  Peng Shuai [30]
Schedule of Play

Day 8 (3 July)
 Seeds out:
 Gentlemen's singles:  Juan Martín del Potro [9],  Mardy Fish [10],  Marin Čilić [16],  Richard Gasquet [18]
 Ladies' singles:  Petra Kvitová [4],  Sabine Lisicki [15],  Maria Kirilenko [17]
 Gentlemen's doubles:  Leander Paes /  Radek Štěpánek [4],  Mahesh Bhupathi /  Rohan Bopanna [7],  Aisam-ul-Haq Qureshi /  Jean-Julien Rojer [8]
 Ladies' doubles:  Yaroslava Shvedova /  Galina Voskoboeva [7],  Natalie Grandin /  Vladimíra Uhlířová [11]
Schedule of Play

Day 9 (4 July)
 Seeds out:
 Gentlemen's singles:  David Ferrer [7],  Mikhail Youzhny [26],  Philipp Kohlschreiber [27],  Florian Mayer [31]
 Ladies' doubles:  Maria Kirilenko /  Nadia Petrova [4],  Ekaterina Makarova /  Elena Vesnina [5],  Bethanie Mattek-Sands /  Sania Mirza [13]
 Mixed Doubles:  Daniele Bracciali /   Roberta Vinci [6],  Aisam-ul-Haq Qureshi /   Andrea Hlaváčková [7],  Mariusz Fyrstenberg /  Abigail Spears [9],  Alexander Peya /   Anna-Lena Grönefeld [16]
Schedule of Play

Day 10 (5 July)
 Seeds out:
 Ladies' singles:  Angelique Kerber [8],  Victoria Azarenka [2]
 Gentlemen's doubles:  Ivan Dodig /  Marcelo Melo [15]
 Ladies' doubles:  Sara Errani /  Roberta Vinci [2],  Nuria Llagostera Vives /  María José Martínez Sánchez [9],  Raquel Kops-Jones /  Abigail Spears [10]
 Mixed Doubles:  Rohan Bopanna /  Zheng Jie [10],  Andy Ram /  Květa Peschke [15]
Schedule of Play

Day 11 (6 July)
 Seeds out:
 Gentlemen's singles:  Novak Djokovic [1],  Jo-Wilfried Tsonga [5]
 Gentlemen's doubles:  Bob Bryan /  Mike Bryan [2],  Jürgen Melzer /  Philipp Petzschner [10]
 Ladies' doubles:  Liezel Huber /  Lisa Raymond [1]
 Mixed Doubles:  Daniel Nestor /   Julia Görges [8]
Schedule of Play

Day 12 (7 July)
 Seeds out:
 Ladies' singles:  Agnieszka Radwańska [3]
 Gentlemen's doubles:  Robert Lindstedt /  Horia Tecău [5]
 Ladies' doubles:  Andrea Hlaváčková /  Lucie Hradecká [6]
 Mixed Doubles:  Bob Bryan /  Liezel Huber [1],  Nenad Zimonjić /  Katarina Srebotnik [3]
Schedule of Play

Day 13 (8 July)
 Seeds out:
 Gentlemen's singles:  Andy Murray [4]
 Mixed Doubles:  Leander Paes /  Elena Vesnina [4]
Schedule of Play

References

Wimbledon Championships by year – Day-by-day summaries